Trevor Howard Lawrence Jackson (born August 30, 1996) is an American actor, singer, and songwriter. He is best known for portraying Aaron Jackson on Freeform original series Grown-ish, Kevin Blake on Syfy original series Eureka, Kris McDuffy on Disney Channel's television movie Let It Shine, and Kevin LaCroix on  American Crime. Other notable appearances include Broadway musical The Lion King, where he played the Young Simba, and television guest star roles on both Cold Case and Harry's Law. In 2012, he won the Young Artist Award for Best Performance in a TV Series. In 2018, he starred as the lead of the crime drama film Superfly as Priest.

Early life
Jackson was born in Indianapolis, Indiana, the younger of two sons of Cam Baxter and Kevin Jackson. His parents are American. Although he comes from a family interested in basketball, at age eight he decided that he would rather work in the entertainment industry. He honed his talents at local venues, performing both within his hometown and nationally, including a dance routine on Showtime at the Apollo. In 2004, the eight-year-old Jackson won the role of Young Simba on the national tour of The Lion King musical, with which he remained.

Career

2010–11: Career beginnings and Eureka
Following his run with The Lion King, he transitioned from Broadway to the small screen appearing as a guest star in an episode of Cold Case in 2010. From 2010 to 2012 he played Kevin Blake in the final two seasons of Eureka. In early 2011, Jackson joined a "behind the scene" group with several up and coming music artist at the time known as "Before 2012." This didn't last long as success tore the group apart before it ever went mainstream. In August 2011, continued his run on TV starring in an episode of Harry’s Law for which he won the Young Artist Award for Best Performance in a TV Series for his role of Willie Blue. Jackson later appeared as a guest star on the Disney Channel television show Austin & Ally.

2012–13: Let It Shine, musical beginnings, #NewThang EP

In 2012, Jackson expanded his acting career into film, playing the role of Quincy Smith in the film A Beautiful Soul. That same year, Jackson went on to star in the original Disney Channel television movie Let It Shine as Kris McDuffy alongside Tyler James Williams. Jackson portrayed the best friend and confidant of Cyrus (James), an aspiring hip hop musician who enters a songwriting contest and mistakenly wins his best friend's dream.  Jackson has completed shooting the film Sons 2 The Grave alongside Darrin Dewitt Henson, Demetria McKinney and Justin Martin.

In 2012, Jackson signed with  Atlantic Records continuing on to release his first single "Like We Grown" in February 2013. In the song's music video, Disney Channel actress, Zendaya Coleman, plays his love interest. Due to demand for new music from his fans, Jackson collaborated with producers Eric Hudson, J.R. Rotem and The Underdogs, to create his EP, #NewThang.

In September 2013, Jackson released the #NewThang EP. Jackson followed with his second single "Drop It", which was featured in McDonald's Monopoly Campaign commercial. To promote the #NewThang EP, Jackson toured with fellow Atlantic Records artist Justine Skye in the High School Nation Tour. He also played in a few shows.

2014–present: In My Feelings
In January 2014, Jackson released "New Thang" followed by a remix to his single "Drop It" featuring rapper B.o.B. In May, Jackson was featured on Diggy Simmons’ single "My Girl". in the summer of 2015 Jackson released his debut full-length album. Jackson released the album's first single, "Good Girl, Bad Girl", on June 3, 2014. On July 22, 2014, Jackson posted a lyric video to a track with Kirko Bangz on his official YouTube channel titled "Me Likey" four days before its iTunes release. On August 3, 2014, Jackson partnered with fellow Atlantic Records artist Diggy Simmons on the Who Else But Us Tour.  Jackson premiered the video for "I'll Be Who You Love (This Christmas)" on Rap-Up on December 3. Jackson followed with a new single, "Know Your Name", featuring Sage The Gemini on December 15. Jackson appeared as a guest on VINE and vocalist LianeV's new single "Keep Playin".

In early August, Jackson released the tracks on his YouTube channel and SoundCloud for stream with a visual for the song "Simple As This". On August 28, 2015, Jackson released the In My Feelings project on iTunes. In September he released the music video for his song "Bang Bang", which features Kevin Gates.

On December 3, 2015, Jackson released a video of "Like I Do" from In My Feelings on Billboard.

Jackson joined the regular cast of American Crime in its second season, playing the part of Kevin Lacroix. At the 2019 Soul Train Music Awards Jackson won the “Soul Train Certified Award”.
Currently Jackson is acting on the new Freeform show "Grown-ish" as Aaron Jackson, a classmate and love interest of Zoey Johnson.

Artistry
Jackson cites Michael Jackson, Gregory Hines, Donny Hathaway, Brian McKnight, and the Nicholas Brothers as his biggest musical influences.

Jackson aimed for his debut album to serve as a cohesive unit, saying it was his goal to "make an album that is not just a bunch of singles, but an album that can be listened to from top to bottom." Conversely, he also "wanted every song to say something, to be an experience."

Philanthropy
Jackson supported Snoop Dogg's anti-violence "No Guns Allowed" campaign by releasing his own cover of Snoop Lion's single "No Guns Allowed", in March 2013. In April 2013, Jackson volunteered at the Ronald McDonald House Charities in Chicago. Jackson participated in the Strike Out Cystic Fibrosis's Bowling Charity Event on July 29, 2013. Jackson hosted the Duffy's Hope 11th Annual Teen Youth Empowerment Summit in Dover, Delaware on August 3, 2013.  The organization helps provide youth with mentoring, health, education and more. Jackson has also worked with NBA Cares and The League of Young Voters Education Fund.

Discography

Studio albums

Extended plays

Mixtapes

Singles

As lead artist

As featured artist

Filmography

Awards and nominations

References

External links 
 
 
 

1996 births
Living people
21st-century American singers
African-American male actors
African-American male child actors
African-American male dancers
African-American songwriters
American contemporary R&B singers
American male child actors
American male dancers
American male film actors
American male musical theatre actors
American male singer-songwriters
American male television actors
Atlantic Records artists
Midwest hip hop musicians
Musicians from Indianapolis
Singer-songwriters from Indiana